The 1933 Baffin Bay earthquake struck Greenland and the Northwest Territories (now Nunavut), Canada with a moment magnitude of 7.4  at  on November 20.

The main shock epicenter was located in Baffin Bay on the east coast of Baffin Island. Shaking was only felt at the small town of Upernavik, Greenland. The event is the largest recorded earthquake to strike the passive margin of North America and is the largest north of the Arctic Circle. No damage was reported because of its offshore location and the small population of the nearby onshore communities.

Tectonic setting
Canada is not typically associated with seismic activity, however, Canada does experience infrequent large earthquakes. At the location of the earthquake, there is an extinct spreading center which formed the Baffin Bay itself. This passive margin is seismic, and occasionally reactivates to slip in a strike slip manner.

Regional seismicity
The region around northwestern Baffin Bay and northeastern Baffin Island continues to be seismically active. Six magnitude 6 earthquakes have occurred there since 1933. Multiple small earthquakes with magnitudes ~4-5.5 still occur each year.

See also
List of earthquakes in 1933
List of earthquakes in Canada

References

Sources

External links

1933 Baffin
1933 Baffin
1933 earthquakes
1933 disasters in Canada